Singapore Land Tower is a 48-storey   skyscraper located in the central business district of Singapore. The tower is located at 50 Raffles Place, adjacent to Raffles Place MRT station. It is just 100 metres away from Boat Quay and Collyer Quay.

The Embassy of Germany is located on the 12th floor, Embassy of Ukraine is on the 16th floor and the Embassy of Colombia occupies the 30th floor of the building.

History 
Construction on the Singapore Land Tower was completed in 1980. The tower underwent alteration and recladding works as well as a new roofing feature of which the works received statutory completion status in August 2003.

Companies involved in the development of the building included Singapore Land Limited, CapitaLand Limited, Rider Hunt Levett & Bailey, Mitsubishi Elevator and Escalator, Architects 61 Pte Ltd, Colliers International (Singapore) Private Limited, Hong Kong Trade Development Council, SEB and The Boston Consulting Group.

See also 
 List of tallest buildings in Singapore

References 

Raffles Place
Skyscraper office buildings in Singapore
Downtown Core (Singapore)
Office buildings completed in 1980
Brutalist architecture in Singapore
20th-century architecture in Singapore